There are two species of bird named barred woodcreeper.

 Northern barred woodcreeper, Dendrocolaptes sanctithomae
 Amazonian barred woodcreeper, Dendrocolaptes certhia